is a Japanese professional futsal club, currently playing in the F. League. The team is located in Machida, Tokyo, Tokyo. Their main arena is Machida Municipal Gymnasium.

Chronicle

Trophies 
All Japan Futsal Championship : 2
2001, 2016

References

External links 
  

Futsal clubs in Japan
Machida, Tokyo
Sports teams in Tokyo
Futsal clubs established in 1999
1999 establishments in Japan